The Vermont Council on Rural Development is a non-profit, federally supported, state rural development council that combines public and private resources to fund programs that improve the rural communities of Vermont, a largely rural state. The organization was created in 1992.

Recent initiatives 
The organization coordinates two key initiatives around creating a green economy: an initiative called "Vermont Climate Economy Initiative" designed around developing enterprises focused on responding to global warming;  and a "Climate Model Communities Program" coordinated with Efficiency Vermont to improve the sustainability of whole communities in Vermont.

Other programs include a community leadership award program, investment in working lands, and regularly policy meetings and summits.

Further reading
 "Council encourages Wilmington residents to set priorities" by Erin George, The Brattleboro Reformer (March 13, 2001)
 "Creative economy works in Vermont", editorial, The Burlington Free Press (April 15, 2006)
 "Getting creative with economics" by Lauren Ober, The Burlington Free Press (April 29, 2006)
 "Group thinks into the future" by Paul Costello and Sarah Waring, Rutland Daily Herald (Dec 30, 2007)
 "Vermont's quiet crisis: Why we need an action plan for the working landscape" by Paul Costello, Rutland Daily Herald (Dec 26, 2010)
 "Creating a climate economy" by Jon Copans (op-ed by the director of the Climate Economy Model Communities Program at the VCRD), Rutland Daily Herald (March 3, 2017)

References 

Non-profit organizations based in Vermont
1992 establishments in Vermont